The 2000–01 FA Cup qualifying rounds opened the 120th season of competition in England for 'The Football Association Challenge Cup' (FA Cup), the world's oldest association football single knockout competition. A total of 602 clubs were accepted for the competition, up 23 from the previous season’s 579.

This season saw invites extended to some teams from Level 10 in the English football pyramid. With the larger number of clubs entering the tournament from non-League teams (Levels 5 through 10), a new Extra preliminary round was added to the tournament.  As a result, the competition started with six rounds of preliminary (2) and qualifying (4) knockouts for these non-League teams.

The 32 winning teams from Fourth qualifying round progressed to the First Round Proper, where League teams tiered at Levels 3 and 4 entered the competition.

Calendar

Extra preliminary round
Matches were played on weekend of Saturday 19 August 2000. 34 clubs from Level 8 and Level 10 of English football, entered at this stage of the competition, while other clubs from levels 8-10 get a bye to the next rounds.

Preliminary round
Matches were played on weekend of Saturday 2 September 2000. A total of 404 clubs took part in this stage of the competition, including the 17 winners from the Extra preliminary round, 300 clubs from Levels 8-10, who get a bye in the extra preliminary round and 87 clubs entering at this stage from the four divisions at Level 7 of English football (all, except Vauxhall Motors). The round featured 40 clubs from Level 10 in the competition, being the lowest ranked clubs in this round.

First qualifying round
Matches were played on weekend of 16 September 2000. A total of 202 clubs took part in this stage of the competition, all having progressed from the preliminary round. The round featured 15 clubs from Level 10 still in the competition, being the lowest ranked clubs in this round.

Second qualifying round
Matches were played on weekend of 30 September 2000. A total of 168 clubs took part in this stage of the competition, including the 101 winners from the first qualifying round and 67 Level 6 clubs, from Premier divisions of the Isthmian League, Northern Premier League and Southern Football League, entering at this stage. AFC Wallingford and Merstham from the Combined Counties Football League and Beaconsfield SYCOB, St Margaretsbury and Waltham Abbey from the Spartan South Midlands Football League, which technically were the Level 10 leagues were the lowest ranked clubs in this round. Also, the round featured seven clubs from Level 9 still in the competition.

Third qualifying round
Matches were played on weekend of 14 October 2000. A total of 84 clubs took part, all having progressed from the second qualifying round. Bracknell Town and Lewes at Level 9 of English football were the lowest-ranked clubs to qualify for this round of the competition.

Fourth qualifying round
Matches were played on weekend of Saturday 28 October 2000. A total of 64 clubs took part, 42 having progressed from the third qualifying round and 22 clubs from Football Conference, forming Level 5 of English football, entering at this stage. The round featured Bracknell Town from Level 9 still in the competition, being the lowest ranked club in this round.

2000–01 FA Cup
See 2000–01 FA Cup for details of the rounds from the First Round Proper onwards.

External links
 Football Club History Database: FA Cup 2000–01
 The FA Cup Archive

FA Cup qualifying rounds
Qual